"I Sang Dixie" is a song written and recorded by American country music artist Dwight Yoakam.  It was released in October 1988 as the second single from his album Buenas Noches from a Lonely Room.  In 1989, the song went to number one on the US Country chart. Rolling Stone ranked "I Sang Dixie" No. 26 on its list of the 40 Saddest Country Songs of All time in 2019.

Content
The song's narrator describes meeting a man from the Southern United States dying on a street in Los Angeles. The narrator, while crying, holds the man and sings 'Dixie' to comfort him as he dies. He goes on to describe how others "walk on by" ignoring the man's suffering. The dying man warns the narrator with his final words to "run back home to that southern land" and escape "what life here has done to [him]".

Chart performance

Year-end charts

Demo version
Yoakam originally recorded a demo version of the song in 1981. It can be found on his 2002 boxed set, Reprise Please, Baby and on the 2006 Deluxe version of Guitars, Cadillacs, Etc., Etc.

References

1988 songs
Dwight Yoakam songs
1988 singles
Songs written by Dwight Yoakam
Reprise Records singles
Song recordings produced by Pete Anderson
Songs about the American South